Bastar may refer to:
 Bastar state, a state founded in the 15th-century that later became a princely state of British India
 Bastar district, an administrative district of Chhattisgarh state in central India
 Bastar division, an administrative division of Chhattisgarh that includes Bastar, Dantewada, and Kanker districts
 Bastar (Lok Sabha constituency), a parliamentary constituency in Chhattisgarh state in central India
 Bastar (Vidhan Sabha constituency), a state assembly constituency within the Parliamentary constituency

See also
 Zall-Bastar, a village and a former municipality in Tirana County, central Albania
 Bastard (disambiguation)